XHZS-FM is a radio station in Coatzacoalcos, Veracruz. Broadcasting on 92.3 FM, XHZS is known as Radio Hit.

History

XEZS-AM 1170 signed on March 18, 1960; the station was owned by Carlos Armando Caballero Mendoza. In 1996, XEZS expanded to FM with the signing on of XHZS-FM 92.3, which had been authorized as a combo in 1994. The AM station broadcast with 2,500 watts during the day and 1,000 at night.

On October 15, 2017, XEZS ceased AM broadcasts after 57 years, leaving the AM band empty in Coatzacoalcos. The station also formally surrendered its AM radio frequency in a letter dated October 2.

References

Radio stations in Veracruz
1960 establishments in Mexico
Radio stations established in 1960